WUIS (91.9 FM), branded on-air as NPR Illinois, is the National Public Radio member station in Springfield, Illinois, United States. It primarily features National Public Radio news and talk programming. The station is owned by and based at the University of Illinois Springfield. It operates a full-time satellite, WIPA in Pittsfield, which serves a small portion of the Quincy market.

History

WUIS originally hit the airwaves on January 3, 1975, as WSSR, operated by what was then Sangamon State University. It became WSSU in 1989, and adopted its current calls when Sangamon State merged with the University of Illinois system in 1995.

WIPA was brought online in 1993.

In 2015, the station rebranded as "NPR Illinois."

External links
WUIS official website

References

UIS
WUIS
Springfield, Illinois
University of Illinois at Springfield
UIS
Radio stations established in 1975
UIS